Sugathapala De Silva (4 August 1928 – 28 October 2002) was an acclaimed Sri Lankan dramatist and novelist, translator, radio play producer, and Sinhala Radio Play writer.

Biography

Early life
Sugathapala De Silva was born on 4 August 1928 Midigama (weligama, Matara), downsouth town 130 kilometres from Colombo to the son of a small trader. He grew up there, among Sinhala, Tamil and Muslim traders. His childhood experiences would later influence him to write the novels Ikbithi Siyalloma Sathutin Jeevathvuha and Esewenam Minisune Me Asaw. According to other writing he was born in Weligama and After studied in a few schools in Galle and from tenth grade studied Jinaraja Boy's College Jinaraja Boy's College , Gampola, and came to Colombo. Sugathapala de Silva worked as a salesman at K.V.G. de Silva's bookstall at Wellawatte. He made this environment read book using free time. That habit amassed in him to gain knowledge which becomes a free thinker, a creator, an innovator, a radical and non-conformist.

1960

De Silva came to Colombo, Sri Lanka in the 1960s, and became engaged in the political and cultural movement, taking place there at that time. Nicknamed the "lovable dictator", he formed the drama group "Apey Kattiya" there, and started to translate and adapt plays by Tennessee Williams and Pirandello, like Cat on a Hot Tin Roof and Six Characters in Search of an Author, to wide acclaim. He followed these plays with original ones, like Thattu Geval and Boarding Karayo which captured the mood of the new city-bred middle classes of the time. Among his other creations are Eka Walle Pol, Boodin Karayo, Hithahonda Ammandi, Harima Badu Hayak, Mutu Kumari, Esala Sanda, Marasad and Snthuvara sebalano.

1970

De Silva's best play is considered by many to be Dunna Dunu Gamuwe, which was written just after the 1971 JVP insurrection. Although centred on a trade union struggle, it had an admixture of politics and art expertly mixed with technique and aided by some superb acting by the late U. Ariyawimal and Wilson Jayasiri was the precursor of the serious political theatre which followed at the end of the decade.

De Silva worked for long time at the Sri Lanka Broadcasting Corporation as a producer, and in the late 1960s was in charge of the weekly radio play, and the weekly short story programs on the station, which were the first "stamping grounds" of writers and dramatists who are today well known in their own right.

De Silva was bed-ridden from 1997, and died in hospital on 28 October 2002.

Produced Plays

Published works

Awards 

 1962  'Bodin karayo' best script and play National drama festival in Sri Lanka
 1971 best literary prize  'Ikbithi Siyalloma Sathutin Jeevathvuha' .
 1987  'Marat sad' best Translation and play National drama festival in Sri Lanka

Scholarships
British government scholarship for study drama.

External links
 Sugathapala De Silva on Sinhala Cinema Database

References

1928 births
2002 deaths
Sri Lankan dramatists and playwrights
Sri Lankan novelists
Sri Lankan radio writers
20th-century novelists
20th-century dramatists and playwrights